Hiram Orlando Fairchild (August 14, 1845October 14, 1925) was an American lawyer and Republican politician.  He was the 34th speaker of the Wisconsin State Assembly and served as the first district attorney of Marinette County, Wisconsin.  His name was often abbreviated as

Biography

Hiram O. Fairchild was born in Newtown, Indiana, in August 1845.  He was raised and educated there, attending high school in Wabash, Indiana.  He went on to attend Wabash College, where he graduated in 1866.  On his graduation from college, he moved to Fort Kearny, Nebraska Territory, where he was employed to work on behalf of the business interests of former Wisconsin judge Levi Hubbell.

After a year, he moved to Oconto, Wisconsin, and studied law under his brother, John B. Fairchild.  He was admitted to the bar in May 1870 and moved to the city of Marinette, Wisconsin, where his father was living.  In 1874, he was joined by his brother and they formed the law firm Fairchild & Fairchild.  Their partnership would last until Hiram's departure from Marinette in 1895.

When Marinette County was organized in 1879, Fairchild was appointed the first district attorney for the county.  He was subsequently elected to six more terms, serving from 1879 through 1891, and 1893 to 1895.  Fairchild was a lifelong Republican, and his stretch as district attorney was only interrupted by the Democratic wave election of 1890.  

While serving as district attorney, Fairchild distinguished himself with the prosecution of Charles E. Crockett over the 1879 killing of John Kelley.  Crockett was a saloon owner in the area and claimed he shot Kelley in self defense after a dispute over payment.  Crockett had many prominent Wisconsin attorneys on his defense team, and, through their considerable efforts, managed to get a change of venue, and, after his conviction, managed to get the verdict stayed by the Wisconsin Supreme Court.  Fairchild was the sole prosecutor on the case and handled the oral arguments before the Wisconsin Supreme Court, where he prevailed in the case Crockett v. State, upholding his conviction of Crockett on manslaughter charges. 

Running on the Republican ticket, he was also elected to two terms in the Wisconsin State Assembly, serving in the 1883 and 1885 sessions of the legislature.  In the 1885 session, he was elected speaker of the Assembly by the Republican majority.  He was also a delegate to the 1888 Republican National Convention.  

In 1895, he moved to Green Bay, Wisconsin, where he formed a new law firm.  In his later years, he was known as one of the most prominent and distinguished lawyers in Wisconsin, working as the senior partner of the law firm Fairchild, North, Parker, and Bie. 

He argued the case of McDermott v. Wisconsin, 228 U.S. 115, before the U.S. Supreme Court, and succeeded in striking down part of Wisconsin's 1907 Pure Foods law.  In the Wisconsin Supreme Court case State v. Redmon, 134 Wis. 89 (1907), he successfully argued for striking down a regulation on railroad car sleeping berths.  And in Chicago & Northwestern Railway Co. v. State, 128 Wis. 553 (1906), he succeeded in striking down Wisconsin's attempts to implement an Ad valorem tax on railroad freight. 

Fairchild died of heart failure on the morning of October 14, 1925, after a long period of declining health.  At the time of his death, he was referred to as the dean of the Brown County Bar.

Personal life and family
Hiram Fairchild was one of seven children born to Reverend John Fairchild and his wife Lorinda ( Bigelow).  John Fairchild, was a Presbyterian minister and practiced at Marinette, Wisconsin, from 1863 until his death in 1885.  Through his mother's Bigelow lineage, Fairchild was a distant cousin of U.S. President James A. Garfield.

Hiram's older sister, Sarah Jane, was married to Harlan P. Bird, who served eight years in the Wisconsin State Senate.

Hiram Fairchild married Emma Haugh of Crawfordsville, Indiana, on November 21, 1871.  They had six children together, though two died in childhood.  Another daughter, Bertha Basche, died in 1920, and Mrs. Fairchild died of pneumonia in 1923.  Fairchild was survived by two sons and one daughter.

Aside from his legal pursuits, Fairchild was a prolific golfer; at the time of his death, he was known as the dean of the Wisconsin golfing community.

Electoral history

Wisconsin Assembly (1882, 1884)

| colspan="6" style="text-align:center;background-color: #e9e9e9;"| General Election, November 7, 1882

| colspan="6" style="text-align:center;background-color: #e9e9e9;"| General Election, November 8, 1884

References

|-

|-

1845 births
1925 deaths
People from Fountain County, Indiana
People from Oconto, Wisconsin
People from Marinette, Wisconsin
Politicians from Green Bay, Wisconsin
Wabash College alumni
Speakers of the Wisconsin State Assembly
District attorneys in Wisconsin